Eilema albescens is a moth of the subfamily Arctiinae first described by Per Olof Christopher Aurivillius in 1910. It is found in Tanzania and Uganda.

References

Moths described in 1910
albescens
Insects of Tanzania
Moths of Africa